The 2020–21 Nemzeti Bajnokság I (known as the K&H férfi kézilabda liga for sponsorship reasons) was the 70th season of the Nemzeti Bajnokság I, Hungarian premier Handball league.

Team information 
As in the previous season, 14 teams played in the 2019–20 season.
After the 2019–20 season, Ceglédi KKSE and Vecsés SE were relegated to the 2019–20 Nemzeti Bajnokság I/B. They were replaced by two clubs from the 2019–20 Nemzeti Bajnokság I/B; Orosházi FKSE and Váci KSE.

Personnel and kits
Following is the list of clubs competing in 2020–21 Nemzeti Bajnokság I, with their president, head coach, kit manufacturer and shirt sponsor.

All teams are obligated to have the logo of the league sponsor OTP Bank as well as the Nemzeti Bajnokság I logo on the right sleeve of their shirt. Hungarian national sports betting brand tippmix sponsors all 14 teams of the first league since February 2019, their logo is therefore present on all team kits.

League table

Standings

Schedule and results
In the table below the home teams are listed on the left and the away teams along the top.

Finals

Game 1

Game 2

MOL-Pick Szeged won the Finals, 68–64 on aggregate.

Season statistics

Top goalscorers

Number of teams by counties

See also
 2020–21 Magyar Kupa
 2020–21 Nemzeti Bajnokság I/B
 2020–21 Nemzeti Bajnokság II

References

External links
 Hungarian Handball Federaration 
 hetmeteres.hu

Nemzeti Bajnokság I (men's handball)
2020–21 domestic handball leagues
Nemzeti Bajnoksag I Men